Wath, sometimes known as Wath-in-Nidderdale to distinguish it from other places named Wath, is a village in the Harrogate district of North Yorkshire, England.

The toponym is derived from the Old Norse vað, meaning "ford".

In the Middle Ages Wath was divided between the lands of Fountains Abbey, north of a small stream known as Dauber Gill, and the lands of the Archbishop of York on the south side. The northern part, including the Sportsman's Arms inn, is now in the civil parish of Fountains Earth, historically a township in the parish of Kirkby Malzeard. The southern and higher part is now in the civil parish of High and Low Bishopside, historically a township in the parish of Ripon.

Sigsworth Grange was a grange of Fountains Abbey.  The present building on the site of the grange dates from the early 18th century.

The small Methodist chapel in the upper part of the village, has an unusual 5-sided shape. It was built in 1859, and was designated a Grade II listed building in 2018.

The ford over the River Nidd, which gave the place its name, was replaced by a bridge by the 16th century.  The present bridge, a narrow road bridge, dates from the early 19th century and is a Grade II listed building.  In the early 20th century Wath had a railway station on the Nidd Valley Light Railway.

References

External  links 

Villages in North Yorkshire
Nidderdale